WUSQ-FM is a country formatted broadcast radio station licensed to Winchester, Virginia, serving the Northern Shenandoah Valley and the Eastern Panhandle of West Virginia. WUSQ-FM is owned and operated by iHeartCommunications, Inc.

References

External links
 Q102 Online
 

1965 establishments in Virginia
Country radio stations in the United States
Radio stations established in 1965
USQ
IHeartMedia radio stations